A Fraternity chapter in general is the lodge-base organizational structure of a fraternity. In Tau Gamma Phi, the Chapter is the basic organizational structure of the fraternity. A Tau Gamma Phi Chapter or better called as Triskelion Chapter is the base organization of the Fraternity as a whole. This is where the fraternal activities and events happen, where the recruitment starts until an individual becomes a full-pledge member or the so-called full-fledged Triskelion. Each Triskelion Chapter is autonomous and is guided by City/Municipal Council and Provincial Council up to the Regional Council and/or Metropolitan Council they belong, thus, every individual Triskelion has a Chapter of origin where they came from. A Tau Gamma Phi member can also have an affiliated Chapter or Welcoming Chapter where each must comply with the residency requirements and Welcome Rites of the Welcoming Chapter. The difference of the basic Chapter from any other organizational body, is that the Chapters are source of decision in terms of governance, activities, man-power and initial resources

Philippine Universities and Collegiate Chapters 

{| width="100%"
|-----
| valign="top" |
National Capital Region — Metro Manila
 Adamson University Metro Manila
 Asian Institute of Maritime Studies Pasay, M.M.
 Asian Institute of Computer Studies Makati City
 Airlink International Aviation School Pasay, M.M.
 AMA Computer College Makati City, M.M.
 AMA Computer University Project 8, Quezon City
 AMA Computer College Manila Founded June 11, 2001 (Sta Mesa)
 AMA Computer College East Rizal
 AMA Computer College Fairview Quezon City
 AMA Computer College Pasig
 AMA Computer College Las Pinas City
 Angelicum College Q.C.
 Arellano Law School Malate, Manila
 Arellano University Sampaloc, Manila
 Asia Pacific College Makati City, M.M.
 Asian Institute of Computer Studies (AICS - Bicutan) - Bicutan, Parañaque city
 Ateneo de Manila University Quezon City, M.M.
 Central Colleges of the Philippines Quezon City, M.M.
 Centro Escolar University Mendiola, Manila
 Colegio de San Juan de Letran Intramuros, Manila
 College of the Holy Spirit Manila Mendiola, Manila
 Commonwealth Sector, Quezon City Council.
  Sta. Mesa, Manila
 Don Bosco Technical College Mandaluyong, M.M.
 Dr. Carlos Lanting College Quezon City, M.M.
 Dr.Filemon C. Aguilar College of Las Piñas, M.M.
 Electron College Main Campus Novaliches Quezon city
 Eulogio "Amang" Rodriguez Institute of Science and Technology Sta. Mesa, Manila
 Far Eastern University Sampaloc, Manila
 Far Eastern University - Fairview Q.C.
 Fatima College of Medicine Valenzuela, M.M.
 FEATI University Sta. Cruz, Manila
 Fatima College of Medicine Valenzuela, M.M.
 Gregorio Araneta University Foundation Malabon, M.M.
 Emilio Aguinaldo College Malate, Manila
 Guzman Institute of Technology Quiapo, Manila
 ICCT Cainta Main Campus,
 Infotech Institute of Arts and Sciences Makati City
 Infotech Institute of Arts and Sciences Marcos hi-way Pasig, City
 Informataics International College Northgate, Alabang
 Informataics International College Cainta
 International Academy of Management and Economics Makati City, M.M.
 Jose Rizal College Mandaluyong, M.M.
 De La Salle University Malate, Manila
 Kaunlaran Ext. Chapter Commonwealth Sector, Quezon City Council.
 La Consolacion College Manila Mendiola, Manila
 Las Pinas College Las Pinas, M.M.
 Lyceum of the Philippines Intramuros, Manila
 Makati Medical Center College of Medicine Makati, City
 Manila Central University Caloocan City, M.M.
 Manuel L. Quezon University Quiapo, Manila
 Manila Doctors College Ermita, Manila
 Mapua Institute of Technology Intramuros, Manila
 Mapua Institute of Technology Information Technical Center Makati City, M.M.
 Marikina Triskelion City Government Employees
 Martinez Memorial Colleges Caloocan City, M.M.
 Metro Manila College Novaliches, Quezon City
 National College of Business and Arts Fairview
 National College of Business and Arts Taytay, Rizal
 National College of Business  Arts Sampaloc, Manila
 National University (Philippines) Sampaloc, Manila
 New Era University, Quezon City, MM
 Olivarez College Chapter in Sucat, Paranaque City
 Ortanez University Quezon City, M.M.
 Our Lady of Fatima University Valenzuela, M.M.
 Our Lady of Fatima University Lagro, QC.
 Pamantasang ng Lungsod ng Maynila Intramuros, M.M.
 Pamantasan ng Lungsod ng Pasig Pasig
 PATTS College of Aeronautics Pasay, M.M.
 Perpetual Help College of Manila Sampaloc, Manila
 Perpetual Help University Las Pinas, M.M.
 Philippine Christian University Malate, Manila
 Philippine College of Criminology Quiapo, Manila
 Philippine Maritime Institute Quiapo, Manila
 Philippine Merchant Marine College Marikina, MM
 Philippine Rehabilitation Institute Banawe, Quezon City
 Philippine School of Business Administration Sampaloc, Manila
 Philippine School of Business Administration Quezon City
 Philippine School of Interior Design Pasong Tamo Makati City
 Polytechnic University of the Philippines Sta. Mesa, Manila
 Polytechnic University of the Philippines Quezon City
 Philippine Women's University Taft Ave. Manila
 Philippine Women's University Edsa, Quezon City
 Philippine Women's University - Jose Abad Santos Memorial School Edsa, Quezon City
 Quezon City Polytechnic University
 Quezon City Polytechnic University, Batasan
 Rizal Technological Polytechnic Institute Morong, Rizal
 RTU Rizal Technological University, Mandaluyong
 Rizal Technological College Pasig, MM
 Saint Jude College Sampaloc, Manila
 Saint Clare College Zabarte Rd, Northern Caloocan
 San Beda College Manila
 San Sebastian College - Recoletos Quiapo, Manila
 SAMSON COLLEGE SCIENCE AND TECHNOLOGY  CUBAO, EDSA
 St.Benedict College Alabang, Muntinlupa
 STI College Taft, MM
 STI College Paranaque, MM
 STI College Fairview, Quezon City
 STI College Cubao, Quezon City
 STI College Global City, Taguig
 STI College Makati City
 STI College Concepcion, Marikina
 STI College Shaw, San Antonio, Pasig, Metro Manila
 Technological University of the Philippines Ermita, Manila
 Technological Institute of the Philippines Quiapo, Manila
 The Fisher Valley Collage Hagonoy, Taguig
 Tomas Claudio Memorial College Morong, Rizal
 Trinity University of Asia Quezon City, MM
 University of Asia and the Pacific Ortigas Center
 University of Manila Sampaloc, Manila
 University of Rizal System (URS)
 University of the East, Manila
 University of Caloocan City-North Caloocan
Universidad De Manila (City College of Manila)
 University of the East Caloocan City, MM
 University of the East - RMMMC Quezon City, MM
 University of the Philippines Diliman, Quezon City
 University of the Philippines, Manila Malate, Manila
  Aurora Ave.Cubao, Q.C.
 University of Santo Tomas Sampaloc, Manila

REGION I
 Colegio de Dagupan
Dagupan City, Pangasinan
 University of Pangasinan Dagupan City, Pangasinan
 Luzon Colleges Dagupan City, Pangasinan
 University of Baguio Baguio City, Benguet
 Divine Word College Laoag City
 Northwestern College Laoag City
 University of the Philippines Baguio Baguio City, Benguet
 Saint Louis University Baguio City, Benguet
 Baguio Colleges Foundation (University of the Cordilleras), Baguio City, Benguet 
 Central Luzon Teachers College Bayambang, Pangasinan
 Mountain State Agricultural College Trinidad, Benguet
 Colegio de Sta. Rita San Carlos City, Pangasinan
 Saint Louis College San Fernando, La Union
 Tarlac College of Agriculture Tarlac, Tarlac
 Nicanor Reyes Memorial College Paniqui, Tarlac
 Mariano Marcos State University Batac, Ilocos Norte
 Northern Christian College Laoag City
 Pines City Educational Center Baguio City, Benguet
 Lyceum Northwestern Dagupan City, Pangasinan
 University of Northern Philippines Vigan, Ilocos Sur
 Mariano Marcos State University Laoag Campus, Laoag City
 Virgin Milagrosa University Foundation San Carlos City, Pangasinan
 Don Mariano Marcos Memorial State University San Fernando, La Union

REGION II
 St. Mary's University Bayombong, Nueva Vizcaya
 Aldersgate College Solano, Nueva Vizcaya
 Cagayan Colleges Tuguegarao, Cagayan
 Saint Ferdinand College Ilagan, Isabela
 Nueva Vizcaya Institute of Technology Bayombong, Nueva Vizcaya
 La Salle College Santiago City
 Nueva Vizcaya Polytechnic College Bambang, Nueva Vizcaya
 Northeastern College Tuguegarao, Cagayan
 Cagayan State University Tuguegarao, Cagayan
 Isabela State University Echague, Isabela
 PLT College Bayombong, NUEVA VIZCAYA
 Cagayan State University Lal-lo, Sta. Maria, CAGAYAN
 Cagayan State Polytechnic College Fermin, Cuayan, ISABELA
 Cagayan State University Mira, CAGAYAN

REGION III
 Aurora State College of Technology, Baler, Aurora
 Mount Carmel College, Baler, Aurora
 Central Luzon State University, Science City of Munoz, Nueva Ecija
 San Jose Colleges San Jose City
 Colleges of the Republic San Jose City
 University of the Philippines, Pampanga Angeles City, Pampanga
 Don Honorio Ventura State University Bacolor, Pampanga
 Don Honorio Ventura State University - Apalit Campus, Apalit, Pampanga
 Our Lady of Fatima University Pampanga - City of San Fernando, Pampanga
 Celtech College - City of San Fernando, Pampanga
 Araullo University Cabanatuan City, Nueva Ecija
 Guagua National Colleges Guagua, Pampanga
 Bulacan National Agricultural Colleges San Ildefonso, Bulacan
 Central Luzon Polytechnic College Cabanatuan City, Nueva Ecija
 Liwag College of Agriculture Cabanatuan City, Nueva Ecija
 AMA Computer College (AMA) Malolos, Bulacan
 ABE International Business College (ABE) Malolos, Bulacan
 Systems Technology Institute (STI) Malolos, Bulacan
 Bulacan State University Malolos, Bulacan
 La Consolacion University Philippines Malolos, Bulacan
 Bulacan polytechnic college Malolos, Bulacan
 Centro Escolar University Malolos City, Bulacan
 Lyceum of Subic Bay
 St. Joseph College Olongapo City
 Wesleyan University of the Philippines Cabanatuan City, Nueva Ecija
 Holy Angel University Angeles City, Pampanga
 Angeles University Foundation Angeles City, Pampanga
 Tarlac State University, Tarlac
 Bataan Peninsula State University, Bataan
 Eastwood /Apcas chapter,  Balanga city,  Bataan
 Salian Triskelion Community Chapter,  Abucay Bataan
 Ramon Magsaysay Technological University Main Campus, Zambales
 Baliuag University, Baliwag, Bulacan
 AMA Computer College, Apalit, Pampanga (AMACLC CHAPTER)

REGION IV
 (PNTC Colleges) Philippine Nautical and Technological College, Dasmariñas Cavite
 AMA Computer College Binan, Laguna
 AMA Computer College, Lucena City
 AMA Computer College, Puerto Princesa City
 ABE International Business College Cainta, Rizal
 Batangas State University (Main and Alangilan Campus)
 Batangas State University (Lipa Campus 2001–2002)
 Calayan Educational Foundation Inc. Lucena City, Quezon
 Colegio De Los Baños (Los Baños, Laguna)
 De La Salle University (Dasma ) Cavite
 Adventist University of the Philippines
 De La Salle College Lipa City Batangas
 Earist Cavite Campus (General Mariano Alvarez, Cavite)
 Emilio Aguinaldo College (Dasma)
 Far Eastern University - Cavite
 Fullbright College Chapter Puerto Princesa City
 INSTITUTE OF CREATIVE COMPUTER TECHNOLOGY ( ICCT CHAPTER ) CAINTA MAIN CAMPUS
 Maguyam Chapter ( Silang, Cavite )
 University of the Philippines Los Baños Los Baños, Laguna
 Manuel S. Enverga University Foundation Lucena City, Quezon
 Manuel S. Enverga University Foundation Catanauan Inc.
 Manuel S. Enverga University Foundation Candelaria Inc.
 Laguna College San Pablo City, Laguna
 Roosevelt College Sumulong Cainta Rizal
 San Pedro College of Business Administration San Pedro, Laguna
 San Pablo Colleges San Pablo City, Laguna
 Southern Luzon Colleges San Pablo City, Laguna
 Sacred Heart College Lucena City, Quezon
 St. Anne College of Lucena Inc. Lucena City, Quezon
 STI College, Lucena City
 STI College Santa Rosa City, Laguna
 Laguna College of Business  Arts Calamba, Laguna
 Polytechnic University of the Philippines Lopez, Quezon
 Colegio de San Juan de Letran Calamba, Laguna
 Laguna State Polytechnic University Siniloan, Laguna
 Perpetual Help College Binan, Laguna
 University Of Perpetual Help System DALTA-Molino Bacoor, Cavite
 Southern Luzon State University Lucban, Quezon
 Southern Luzon State University Lucena City, Quezon
 Roxas College Roxas, Oriental Mindoro
 Philippine Union College Silang, Cavite
 Divine Word College San Jose, Occidental Mindoro
 Divine Word College Calapan, Oriental Mindoro
 University of Batangas, Batangas City
 Palawan State College Puerto Princesa, Palawan
 Palawan State University, Narra, Palawan
 Palawan State University, Taytay, Palawan
 Mindoro College of Agriculture  Tech. Alcate, Victoria, Or. Mindoro
 Holy Trinity College Puerto Princesa, Palawan
 Romblon State College Odiongan, Romblon
 State Polytechnic College of Palawan Aborlan, PALAWAN
 Palawan Polytechnic College Puerto Princesa City
 Narra Palawan Municipal Council, Narra, PALAWAN
 San Francisco Javier College, Narra, PALAWAN
 Cavite State University (Indang)
 Cavite State University (Carmona)
 Cavite State University (Silang)
 Cavite State University (Naic)
 Cavite State University (Bacoor)
 Cavite State University (Imus)
 Cavite State University (Trece Martires City)
 Cavite State University (Tanza)
 Cavite State University (Cavite City)
 Cavite State University (Rosario)
 Lyceum University-Batangas Batangas City, Batangas
 National College of Science and Technology(Dasma) Dasmarinas, Cavite
 Institute of Creative Computer Technology (ICCT)Colleges Cainta, Rizal
 Imus Computer College-GMA(ICC-GMA) GMA, Cavite
 Trece Martires City College(Trece Martires City, Cavite)
 Technological University of the Philippines at Cavite Campus (Dasmariñas City Cavite)
 Unciano Paramedical Colleges Antipolo, Rizal
 Colegio De Montalban - Rodriguez, Rizal
 Geronimo Highschool  - Rodriguez, Rizal
 Western Philippines University, Elnido, Palawan
 Binambangan Triskelion Community Chapter, Indang CavitecHAPTER
 Floodway A Chapter - Taytay, Rizal
 Salamat Community Chapter - Taytay, Rizal
 Maharlika Community Chapter - Taytay, Rizal
 Damayan Community Chapter - Taytay, Rizal

| valign="top" |
REGION V

ALBAY
 Aquinas University Legazpi City, Albay
 Banua Chapter (Brgy 21, Binanuahan West, Legazpi City, Albay)
 Bicol University (BU) Legazpi City, Albay
 Bicol University College of  Agriculture and Fisheries (BUCAF) Tabaco, Albay
 Bicol University Tabaco Campus
(BUTC) Tabaco, Albay
 TRISKELION MUNICIPAL COUNCIL OF TIWI (formerly TIWI CHAPTER)Tiwi, Albay
       1. NAGAS CHAPTER
       2. NAGA CHAPTER
       3. LIBJO CHAPTER
       4. BAYBAY CHAPTER
       5. TIGBI CHAPTER
       6. TAU GAMMA SIGMA-TIWI
       7. TIWI TRISKELION ALUMNI ORGANIZATION (TITAO)
       8. Council of Elders
       9. Judicial Council
 Divine Word College Legazpi City, Albay
 Ago Medical  Educational Center Legazpi City, Albay
 Tanchuling Chapter (Imperial Court Legazpi City, Albay)
 AMA Computer College, Albay
 Bicol College Daraga, Albay
 Ligao Community College, Ligao City, Albay
Puro Chapter (Brgy 59Puro Legazpi City

CAMARINES NORTE
 Mabini Colleges Daet, Camarines Norte
 Camarines Norte State College Daet, Camarines Norte

CAMARINES SUR
 University of Nueva Caseres Naga City, Camarines Sur
 University of Northeastern Philippines Iriga City, Camarines Sur
 Ateneo de Naga Naga City, Camarines Sur
 Naga College Naga City, Camarines Sur
 University of Saint Anthony Iriga City, Camarines Sur
 Central Bicol State University of Agriculture Pili, Camarines Sur
 Bicol College of Arts  Trade Naga City, Camarines Sur
 Pasacao School of Fisheries (PASACAO), Pasacao, Camarines Sur
 Colegio de Santa Isabel Naga City, Camarines Sur
 Mariners Polytechnic College Canaman, Camarines Sur
 Partido College Goa, Camarines Sur
 Ago Foundation College Naga City, Camarines Sur
 Camarines Sur Polytechnic College Nabua, Camarines Sur

CATANDUANES
 Catanduanes State Colleges Virac, Catanduanes

MASBATE
 Ovilla Technical College Masbate, Masbate
 Masbate College Masbate, Masbate

SORSOGON
 Colegio dela Milagrosa Sorsogon, Sorsogon
 Bulan, Sorsogon
 Sorsogon State College (Bulan Campus)

REGION VI
 Iloilo Doctors College Chapter
 AMA Computer College Chapter
 St. Therese College - MTC Tigbauan Chapter
 West Negros University Bacolod City, Negros Occidental
 University of San Agustin, Iloilo City
 University of Negros - Recoletos, Bacolod City
 Western Institute of Technology, Iloilo City
 Central Philippines University, Iloilo City
 University of Iloilo, Iloilo City
 Garcia College of Technology Kalibo, Aklan
 Northwestern Visayas College Kalibo, Aklan
 Filamer Christian University Roxas City, Capiz
 Colegio de la Purisima Concepcion Roxas City, Capiz
 La Salle College Victorias, Negros Occidental
 John B. Lacson Colleges Foundation, Bacolod City
 University of the Philippines - Visayas Miag-ao, ILOILO
 Aklan State University - Main Chapter, Banga, aklan
 John B. Lacson Foundation Maritime University - Molo "Gear", Iloilo City

REGION VII
 Siliman University, Dumaguete City, Negros Oriental
 Negros Oriental State University - Main Campus, Dumaguete City, Negros Oriental
 Negros Oriental State University - Guihulngan Campus, Guihulngan City, Negros Oriental
 Cebu Institute of Technology Cebu City, Cebu
 University of San Carlos Cebu City, Cebu
 Velez College Cebu City, Cebu
 University of San Jose Recoletos Cebu City, Cebu
 University of the Visayas Cebu City, Cebu
 Southwestern University Cebu City, Cebu
 AMA Computer College Cebu City, Cebu
 Cebu Central Colleges Cebu City, Cebu
 University of Bohol Tagbilaran City
 University of the Philippines Cebu City, Cebu
 University of Cebu - Main Campus
 University of Cebu - Mambaling Campus
 University of Cebu - Lapu-Lapu - Mandaue Campus
 University of the Visayas - Main Campus
 Cebu Doctor's College Cebu City, Cebu
 Philippine State College of Aeronautics Cebu City, Cebu
 Cebu Technological University - Main Campus & Danao City Campus
 Indiana Aerospace University, Cebu
University of Southern Philippines Foundation 

REGION VIII
 Divine Word College Tacloban City, Leyte
 Western Leyte College, Ormoc City
 Leyte Institute of Technology Tacloban City, Leyte
 Biliran National Agricultural College Biliran, Biliran
 Leyte Colleges Tacloban City, Leyte
 Leyte State University
 Visayas State College of Agriculture Baybay, Leyte
 Eastern Samar State University (ESSU) - former Eastern Samar State College (ESSC)
 University of Eastern Philippines Catarman, Northern Samar
 Teburcio Tancenco Memorial Institute of Technology (TTMIST)
 Palompon Polytechnic University Palompon, Leyte
 Samar State Polytechnic College Catbalogan, Samar
 Christ the King College
 University of the Philippines Tacloban City, Leyte
 Saint Joseph College Maasin, Southern Leyte
 Saint Peter's College, Ormoc City
 Biliran Province State University (BIPSU)-former Naval State University (NSU) Naval, BILIRAN
 Our Lady of Mercy College, Borongan
 St. Mary's College (SMC Borongan) - former St. Joseph's College (SJC Borongan)

REGION IX
 Western Mindanao State University
 AMA Computer College Zamboanga
 Ateneo de Zamboanga University
 Zamboanga School of Marine Science Technology
 Zamboanga Peninsula Polytechnic State University
 Zamboanga A.E. Colleges
 Zamboanga del Sur Maritime Institute of Technology

REGION X
 Xavier University- Ateneo de Cagayan, Cagayan de Oro City
 Cagayan de Oro College- Phinma Education Network, Cagayan de Oro City
 Liceo de Cagayan University Chapter, Cagayan de Oro City
 Capitol University, Cagayan de Oro City
 Central Mindanao State University Musuan, Valencia, Bukidnon
 Mountain View College Valencia City, Bukidnon
 Bukidnon State College Malaybalay, Bukidnon
 Bukidnon State External College, Gingoog City
 Misamis University Ozamis City, Misamis Occidental
 Southern Capitol College Oroquita City, Misamis Occidental
 Polytechnic State College, Camiguin Province Northern Mindanao

REGION XI
 Ateneo de Davao University- Davao City
 AMA Computer College- Davao City
 Agro-Industrial Foundation Colleges of the Phils.- Davao City
 Cor Jesu College(formerly Holy Cross College of Digos)
 Davao del Sur Polytechnic School- Digos City
 Davao Doctors College- Davao City
 Davao Medical School- Davao City
 Davao Merchant Marine Academy- Davao City
 Holy Cross of Davao College- Davao City
 International Harvardian University- Davao City
 Saint Mary's College- Tagum, Davao del Norte
 San Pedro College- Davao City
 Southern Philippines Adventist College- Davao del Sur
 Mindanao Aeronautical Technical School (MATS)- Davao City
 USP College of Fisheries- Davao City
 USP College of Agriculture Forestry- Tagum, Davao del Norte
 University of Southern Philippines(Main)- Davao City
 University of Mindanao- Bansalan, Davao del Sur
 University of Mindanao- Davao City
 University of Mindanao- Digos City
 University of Mindanao- Tagum, Davao del Norte
 University of the Immaculate Conception- Davao City

REGION XII
 St. Peter's College Iligan City, Lanao del Norte
 MSU Iligan Institute of Technology Iligan City, Lanao del Norte
 Lanao del Norte Agricultural College Karumatan, Lanao del Norte
 University of Southern Mindanao Kabacan, North Cotabato
 Notre Dame of Midsayap College Midsayap, North Cotabato
 MSU - Dinaig Agricultural Technical College Dinaig, Maguindanao
 North Cotabato School of Arts Trade, North Cotabato
 UPI Agricultural School UPI, MAGUINDANAO
 Cotabato Foundation College of Science Tech. Doroloman, Arakan, Cotabato

ARMM I
 St. Benedict College of Maguindanao, Parang, Maguindanao
 Parang Foundation College, Parang, Maguindanao
 Illana Bay Integrated Computer College, Parang, Maguindanao
 Sulu State College Jolo, Sulu
 MSU - Tawi Tawi Bongao, Tawi Tawi
 Notre Dame of Jolo College Jolo, Sulu
 Central Sulu College Siasi, SULU
 Agama Islam Academy Ganassi, Lanao del Sur
 Lanao National College of Arts Trade Marawi City, Lanao del Sur
 Mindanao State University Marawi City, Lanao del Sur
 Lanao Agricultural College Lumbatan, Lanao del Sur
 Pangarungan Islam College Marawi City, Lanao del Sur
 Jamiatul Philippines of Al-Islamia Marawi City, Lanao del Sur
 Mindanao State University Malabang, Lanao del Sur

SOCSARGEN
 Central Mindanao Colleges Kidapawan, South Cotabato
 Notre Dame University, Cotabato City
 System Technology Institute, Cotabato City
 St. Benedict College, Cotabato City
 Notre Dame -RVM College, Cotabato City
 Cotabato State University (Former CCSPC), Cotabato City
 Mindanao Institute of Technology, Cotabato City
 University of Mindanao, Cotabato City
 Philippine Harvadian College, Cotabato City
 Notre Dame of Kidapawan College Kidapawan, South Cotabato
 Notre Dame of Marbel College Koronadal, South Cotabato
 Mindanao State University Gen. Santos City, South Cotabato
 Notre Dame of Dadiangas Gen. Santos City, South Cotabato
 Ramon Magsaysay Memorial College Gen. Santos City, South Cotabato
 Glan School of Arts  Trade Glan, Sarangani
 Polytechnic College Makar, Gen. Santos City

Caraga Region XIII
 Father Saturnino Urios University, Butuan City, Agusan del Norte
 San Nicolas College, Surigao City
 Northern Mindanao State Institute of Technology,( University) Butuan City
 St. Joseph Institute of Technology, Butuan City
 A.M.A CLC, Butuan City
 Butuan Doctors College, Butuan City
 Holy Child Colleges, Butuan City
 STI, Butuan City
 Bayugan City Council
 Surigao del Norte College of Agriculture and Technology

 Surigao State College of Technology, Surigao City
 Tubajon Municipal Chapter, Dinagat Islands
 Sukailang-Anomar Triskelion Community Based Chapter, Surigao City Council

References

SAMSON COLLEGE SCIENCE AND TECHNOLOGY CUBAO EDSA

Tau Gamma Phi